Yeskinskaya is a rural locality (a village) in Nizhneslobodskoye Rural Settlement, Vozhegodsky District, Vologda Oblast, Russia. The population was 2 as of 2002.

Geography 
Yeskinskaya is located 47 km east of Vozhega (the district's administrative centre) by road. Pavlovskaya is the nearest rural locality.

References 

Rural localities in Vozhegodsky District